The Andorra national football team has represented Andorra in international association football since 1996. Although the nation declared constitutional independence in March 1993, the national team was forced to wait three years before making its official debut until the side were accepted as members of the Union of European Football Associations (UEFA) and the International Federation of Association Football (FIFA). Andorra played their first official international fixture on 13 November 1996, suffering a 6–1 defeat to Estonia in the Andorran capital city Andorra la Vella. The team is governed by the Andorran Football Federation (AFF) and compete as a member of UEFA, which encompasses the countries of Europe and Israel. As of March 2019, Andorra have played 158 matches, winning 6, drawing 19 and losing 133. Andorra have played more matches against Estonia than any other international side, losing all 12 meetings between the teams. In global and continental competitions, the team has competed in qualification groups for both the FIFA World Cup, since 2002, and the UEFA European Championship, since 2000, but have failed to qualify for any tournament finals.

Spanish-born defender Ildefons Lima is the nation's most capped player, accumulating 121 appearances as of March 2019, having made his international debut in June 1997 against Estonia. He broke the record held by Óscar Sonejee on 16 August 2017 after playing in a friendly match against Qatar. Lima and Sonejee are the only players to have achieved 100 caps for the Andorran national side. Despite playing as a defender, Lima is also the nation's leading goalscorer of all time, scoring eleven goals as of March 2019, and is the only player to have scored five or more goals for the side.

The first player to reach 25 caps for Andorra was Txema Garcia, on 2 September 2000 in a 3–2 defeat to Cyprus. Óscar Sonejee became the first Andorran player to accumulate 100 caps, reaching the tally on 6 June 2015 in a 1–0 defeat to Equatorial Guinea. He went on to finish his international career with 106 caps, holding the caps record until 2017 when Lima overtook him. Koldo is the most capped goalkeeper in Andorra's history having appeared 78 times during an eleven-year spell with the national side. He was later named as his country's "golden player" by the AFF during the UEFA Jubilee Awards in 2004 as Andorra's "single most outstanding player". A year after announcing his retirement, he was appointed manager of the national side.

As of March 2019, 36 players have accumulated 25 caps or more for Andorra at international level, including the nation's oldest (Juli Sánchez, 40 years and 275 days) and youngest internationals (Sergi Moreno, 16 years and 125 days).

List
Appearances and goals are composed of FIFA World Cup and UEFA European Championship and each competition's required qualification matches, as well as numerous international friendly tournaments and matches. Players are listed by number of caps. If the number of caps is equal, the players are then listed alphabetically. Statistics updated following match played on 25 March 2019.

Notes

References

External links
 Andorra national football team at National-Football-Teams.com

 
Association football player non-biographical articles